The Prices Information Cup was a Korean Go competition from 2005 to 2014.

Outline
Only players above 6 dan could participate. The time format was hayago. The winner's purse was 20,000,000 Won (~US$21,000).

Past winners

References

External links
 Sensei's Library
 Go to Everyone!
 Korea Baduk Association (in Korean)

Go competitions in South Korea